The 2002 Acropolis Rally (formally the 49th Acropolis Rally) was the seventh round of the 2002 World Rally Championship. The race was held over three days between 14 June and 16 June 2002, and was won by Ford's Colin McRae, his 24th win in the World Rally Championship.

Background

Entry list

Itinerary
All dates and times are EEST (UTC+3).

Results

Overall

World Rally Cars

Classification

Special stages

Championship standings

Junior World Rally Championship

Classification

Special stages

Championship standings

References

External links 
 Official website of the World Rally Championship

Greece
Acropolis Rally
2002 in Greek sport